Bekim Babić (born 1 January 1975) is a Bosnia and Herzegovina cross-country skier. He competed at the 1992 Winter Olympics and the 1994 Winter Olympics.

References

External links
 

1975 births
Living people
Bosnia and Herzegovina male cross-country skiers
Olympic cross-country skiers of Yugoslavia
Olympic cross-country skiers of Bosnia and Herzegovina
Cross-country skiers at the 1992 Winter Olympics
Cross-country skiers at the 1994 Winter Olympics
Sportspeople from Sarajevo